Stagecoach Express may refer to:

Stagecoach Express (film)
Stagecoach Group